Nicholas Cozat Marquis Jacobs (born October 13, 1991) is an American football tight end who is currently a free agent. He was signed as an undrafted free agent by the New Orleans Saints after the 2014 NFL Draft. He played college football at McNeese State, after transferring from Louisiana State.

Professional career

New Orleans Saints
Following the 2014 NFL Draft, Jacobs was signed by the New Orleans Saints as an undrafted free agent. He was signed to their practice squad on September 1, 2014.

Jacksonville Jaguars
On September 23, 2014, Jacobs was signed to the Jacksonville Jaguars 53-man roster. On August 30, 2016, he was released by the Jaguars.

Baltimore Ravens
On November 2, 2016, Jacobs was signed to the Baltimore Ravens' practice squad but was released three days later.

References

External links
Jacksonville Jaguars bio 
New Orleans Saints bio 
McNeese State Cowboys bio 
LSU Tigers bio 

1991 births
Living people
People from Many, Louisiana
Players of American football from Louisiana
American football tight ends
LSU Tigers football players
McNeese Cowboys football players
McNeese State University alumni
New Orleans Saints players
Jacksonville Jaguars players
Baltimore Ravens players